Central McDougall is a largely residential neighbourhood in the City of Edmonton, Alberta, Canada located immediately north of the downtown core.

Located within the neighbourhood are the Royal Alexandra Hospital, the Prince of Wales Armory, the Victoria School of Performing and Visual Arts, and the administrative offices of the Edmonton Public School System.  Kingsway Mall is located immediately to the north of Central McDougall in the neighbourhood of Spruce Avenue, as is the Glenrose Rehabilitation Hospital and the Norwood Extended Care Centre North.

The neighbourhood is bounded on the north by 111 Avenue, on the south by 105 Avenue, on the east by 101 Street and on the west by 109 Street.  Kingsway Avenue runs through Central McDougall.

The community is represented by the Central McDougall Community League, established in 1923.

Demographics 

Central McDougall is one of Edmonton's lower income neighbourhoods, with an average household income that is significantly below that of households in Edmonton at large.

Future developments 
Central McDougall and neighbouring Queen Mary Park are part of the city's "North Edge" redevelopment plan (north edge here refers to the norther edge of the downtown, not of the city), which will see the construction of several new condominium towers.

Currently there are plans for a new residential condominium complex called Aurora located at the south end of the neighbourhood.  The Aurora will be located on a parcel of land bounded by 105 Avenue on the south, 106 Avenue on the north, 102 Street on the east, and 103 Street on the west.

When complete, this project, with an estimated value of over half a billion dollars, will add five high rise towers to the Edmonton skyline.  In addition, the proposal includes another three low rise buildings.  The completed project will have 1,220 housing units and a retail component.

Surrounding neighbourhoods

See also 
 Edmonton Federation of Community Leagues

References

External links 
 Central McDougall Community League

Neighbourhoods in Edmonton